Elections to Rochford Council were held on 2 May 2002. The whole council was up for election with boundary changes since the last election in 2000 reducing the number of seats by 1. The Conservative party gained overall control of the council from no overall control.

Election result

8 Conservative and 1 Independent candidates were unopposed.

Ward results

Ashingdon and Canewdon

Barling and Sutton

Downhall and Rawreth

Foulness and Great Wakering

Grange

Hawkwell North

Hawkwell South

Hawkwell West

Hockley Central

Hockley North

Hockley West

Hullbridge

Lodge

Rayleigh Central

Rochford

Sweyne Park

Trinity

Wheatley

Whitehouse

References
2002 Rochford election result
Ward results 

2002
2002 English local elections
2000s in Essex